Chatra Nandalal Institution, in Serampore, was established in 1874 in Hooghly District, West Bengal, India. It is situated on the bank of the Hooghly River and having a river side view of the cantonment town of Barrackpore.

Academic affiliation
The school is affiliated to the West Bengal Board of Secondary Education, which holds the Madhyamik exams after grade (class) 10 and West Bengal Council of Higher Secondary Education, which holds the Uchcha Madhyamik exams after grade (class) 12.

References

Boys' schools in India
High schools and secondary schools in West Bengal
Schools in Hooghly district
Serampore
Educational institutions established in 1874
1874 establishments in India